Eivind Skabo (August 17, 1916 – April 18, 2006) was a Norwegian sprint canoeist who competed in the late 1940s. He won a bronze medal in the K-1 10000 m event at the 1948 Summer Olympics in London.

Skabio also won a silver medal in K-1 4 x 500 m at the 1948 ICF Canoe Sprint World Championships, also in London.

References

Sports-reference.com profile

1916 births
2006 deaths
Canoeists at the 1948 Summer Olympics
Norwegian male canoeists
Olympic canoeists of Norway
Olympic bronze medalists for Norway
Olympic medalists in canoeing
ICF Canoe Sprint World Championships medalists in kayak
Medalists at the 1948 Summer Olympics